Cardiida is an order of bivalves belonging to the class Bivalvia.

Families:
 Cardiidae
 Donacidae
 Ephippiodontidae
 Ferganoconchidae
 Glaucomyidae
 Goniocardiidae
 Icanotiidae
 Lahillidae
 Limnocyrenidae
 Lutetidae
 Psammobiidae
 Pterocardiidae
 Quenstedtiidae
 Semelidae
 Solecurtidae
 Sowerbyidae
 Tancrediidae
 Tellinidae
 Unicardiopsidae

References

Bivalves
Bivalve orders